"Taxman" is a song by The Beatles.

Taxman or The Taxman may also refer to:
 Taxman (occupation) or tax collector, a person collecting unpaid taxes
 Taxman (film), a 1999 film by Avi Nesher
 Taxman (video game), a 1981 Pac-Man clone for the Apple II
 Christian Whitehead, or Taxman, Australian video game programmer and designer
 The Taxman, former hype man for Kottonmouth Kings
 TAXMAN, Thorne McCarty's project on legal informatics